Star X Speed Story is the debut solo album by guitarist Jacky Vincent. The album was released in 2013 through Shrapnel Records and consists of 13 songs. Additional instrumentation was provided by fellow (now former) Falling in Reverse members, Ryan Seaman (drums) and Ron Ficarro (bass).

Track listing
All songs composed by Jacky Vincent.

Musicians

Primary
 Jacky Vincent – Guitars, Composer, Keyboards, Producer
 Ryan Seaman – drums
 Ron Ficarro – bass

Additional
 Paul Gilbert - guitar (featured on song "Heaven Or Hell")
 Michael Angelo Batio - guitar (featured on song "Star X Speed")
 Dario Lorina - guitar (featured on song "Burning Tears")

Production
 Mike Varney - Executive Producer
 Kelly Cairns - Drum Editing
 Jason Constantine - Additional Production, Engineer, Mastering, Mixing

References

2013 debut albums
Jacky Vincent albums
Shrapnel Records albums